A fun run is a friendly race that involves either road running or cross country running with participants taking part for their own enjoyment rather than competition. A fun run will usually be held to raise funds for a charity, with sponsors providing the revenue to cover organisational costs. Fun runs can include novelty categories, such as wearing costumes, and age categories for child, teen, and mature. Fun runs can also be included as a side event to a marathon or other more serious races. Motorcycle, snowmobile, and other motorized vehicle events are also sometimes categorized as "fun runs". One of the biggest annual fun runs in Europe is "la Cursa El Corte Inglés" in Barcelona with about 55,000 participants.

References 

Leisure activities
Running events